Belle Haven is a town in Accomack and Northampton counties in the U.S. state of Virginia. The population was 532 at the 2010 census.

Geography
Belle Haven is located at  (37.549989, −75.824329).

Demographics

At the 2000 census there were 480 people, 220 households, and 139 families living in the town. The population density was 317.1 people per square mile (122.7/km). There were 248 housing units at an average density of 163.8 per square mile (63.4/km).  The racial makeup of the town was 78.12% White, 19.38% African American, 0.83% Native American, 0.62% Asian, 0.62% from other races, and 0.42% from two or more races. Hispanic or Latino of any race were 0.83%.

Of the 220 households 25.9% had children under the age of 18 living with them, 44.1% were married couples living together, 18.2% had a female householder with no husband present, and 36.8% were non-families. 33.6% of households were one person and 17.7% were one person aged 65 or older. The average household size was 2.11 and the average family size was 2.62.

The age distribution was 20.4% under the age of 18, 6.0% from 18 to 24, 24.8% from 25 to 44, 27.3% from 45 to 64, and 21.5% 65 or older. The median age was 44 years. For every 100 females, there were 79.1 males. For every 100 females age 18 and over, there were 69.8 males.

The median household income was $33,500 and the median family income  was $37,250. Males had a median income of $26,750 versus $21,146 for females. The per capita income for the town was $17,009. About 7.2% of families and 8.9% of the population were below the poverty line, including 1.1% of those under age 18 and 25.6% of those age 65 or over.

References

Towns in Virginia
Towns in Accomack County, Virginia
Towns in Northampton County, Virginia